Hikmet Çiftçi (born 10 March 1998) is a Turkish professional footballer who plays as a midfielder for Göztepe, on loan from 2. Bundesliga club 1. FC Kaiserslautern.

Career
On 11 June 2019, Çiftçi signed his first professional contract with Erzgebirge Aue. He made his professional debut with Erzgebirge Aue in a 3–1 2. Bundesliga loss to Arminia Bielefeld on 17 August 2019.

On 8 January 2020, Çiftçi transferred to 1. FC Kaiserslautern.

On 20 January 2023, was loaned by Göztepe until the end of the season.

References

External links
 
 
 

2000 births
Living people
German people of Turkish descent
Sportspeople from Neuss
Turkish footballers
German footballers
Footballers from North Rhine-Westphalia
Association football midfielders
Turkey youth international footballers
2. Bundesliga players
3. Liga players
Regionalliga players
1. FC Kaiserslautern players
FC Erzgebirge Aue players
1. FC Köln II players
Göztepe S.K. footballers